William J. Butler    was a Major League Baseball outfielder for the 1884  Indianapolis Hoosiers. He later played minor league ball in the Texas League from 1902-1906.

External links
Baseball-Reference page

1861 births
19th-century baseball players
Baseball players from Louisiana
Major League Baseball outfielders
Indianapolis Hoosiers (AA) players
Dallas Griffins players
Paris Parasites players
Dallas Giants players
Waco Steers players
Ardmore Territorians players
Fort Worth Panthers players
Waco Tigers players
Temple Boll Weevils players
1895 deaths